A jointer or in some configurations, a jointer-planer (also known in the UK and Australia as a planer or surface planer, and sometimes also as a buzzer or flat top) is a woodworking machine used to produce a flat surface along a board's length.  As a jointer, the machine operates on the narrow edge of boards, preparing them for use as butt joint or gluing into panels. A planer-jointer setup has the width that enables smoothing ('surface planing') and leveling the faces (widths) of boards small enough to fit the tables.

Name 
The jointer derives its name from its primary function of producing flat edges on boards prior to joining them edge-to-edge to produce wider boards. The use of this term probably arises from the name of a type of hand plane, the jointer plane, which is also used primarily for this purpose. 

"Planer" is the normal term in the UK and Australia for what is called a "jointer" in North America, where the former term refers exclusively to a thickness planer.

Design
Fundamentally, a jointer's table arrangement is designed with two levels like a narrower thickness planer so that it consists of two long, narrow parallel tables in a row with a cutter head recessed between them, but with a side guide. This cutter head is typically driven by an electric induction motor. (Older machines were driven by belts from line shafts.) A moveable fence is normally set perpendicular to the tables, though some models may allow settings (adjustments) to various angles.

These tables are referred to as the infeed and outfeed, the table from which the work piece is fed into the machine and the height reference table on which the work piece is floated over lightly as leaves the machine's cutting head. The cutting blades are adjusted to match the height and pitch of (& made square to) the outfeed table. The work piece to be planed flat is placed on the infeed table and passed over the cutter head to the outfeed table, with care taken to maintain a constant feed speed and downward pressure.

The cutter head contains two or more knives which are honed to a very sharp edge. The knives are arranged radially in the cylindrical cutter head such that their cutting edges protrude from the cutter head so that they will come into contact with the board being cut as the cutter head spins. The cutter head's axis of rotation is parallel to the table surfaces and perpendicular to the feed direction. The knives cut into the board in the direction opposite to the feed.

Some, more expensive, jointer models contain a spiral, or helical, cutting head. This configuration has many individually mounted, self-indexing knives that can be rotated to a new edge when necessary. Other, older, models have cutter heads that are not cylindrical but instead square. This leaves a significantly larger open region below the level of the blade edges and creates a larger hazard as hands, etc., can be pulled in further and cut more deeply.

The infeed and outfeed tables can be raised or lowered independently of each other and in relation to the cutter head although the outfeed table is normally set so that it is level with the knives when at the top dead centre of the rotation of the cutter head. The infeed table is adjusted so that it is lower than the outfeed table and this gives the depth of cut.

Jointers for home workshops usually have a 4–6 inch (100–150mm) width of cut. Larger machines, often 8–16 inches (200–400mm), are used in industrial settings.

Operation
In operation, the board to be jointed is held with its face against the fence and the edge to be jointed resting on the infeed table. The board is fed across the cutter head and onto the outfeed table. The knives in the revolving cutter head remove an amount of material and the relationship of the two tables and the fence keeps the board oriented in such a way that the result is an edge which is flat along its length and perpendicular to the board's face.

A jointer may also be used to flatten the face of a board, in which case the sole focus is to produce a flat surface on the face of the board and the fence is not used. This procedure is often performed prior to edge jointing so that the board has a flat reference face for subsequent operations.

To straighten a piece of bowed timber, the guard is temporarily swung out of the way. The machine is switched on and the timber is slowly lowered to the machine table, with the concave side down. A few cuts are made out of the red section "A".
The timber is turned end for end and the same procedure is done to the section "B". This is repeated as required with the operator sighting along the length of the timber from time to time to check on straightness of the timber. When the timber is almost straight, the guard is replaced and the last cut is made in the normal way.

Twisted material is treated in a similar way. The operator lays the timber on the bed of the machine and rocks it slowly from side to side to estimate the amount of twist. If there is, say, 20mm of twist in the board, he holds the board level and takes 10mm off one end, then repeats it for the other end.

Jointers are also used for making rebates (also known as rabbets in North America) in finished timber. The fence is set to the width of the rebate and the infeed table is set to the depth. A jointer that is used for rebating has the outside ends of its blades also sharpened and set with a small clearance from the cutter head.

A jointer cannot be used to create a board of even thickness along its length. For this task, after jointing one face, a thickness planer is used.

Thickness planers and jointers are often combined into one machine, with the work piece passing underneath the same rotating blade for thicknessing, but in the opposite direction. In the US this is called a planer–thicknesser or over-and-under.

See also
 combination machine
 Thickness planer

References

Woodworking machines

pdc:Howwel